The India national cricket team toured New Zealand from 7 December 1998 to 19 January 1999 and played a three-match Test series against New Zealand. New Zealand won the series 1–0. The two teams also played a 5-match ODI series that ended in a 2–2 draw.

Test series

1st Test

2nd Test

3rd Test

ODIs

1st ODI

2nd ODI

3rd ODI

4th ODI

5th ODI

References

External links
 Tour home at ESPNcricinfo
 

1998 in Indian cricket
1998 in New Zealand cricket
1999 in Indian cricket
1999 in New Zealand cricket
1998-99
International cricket competitions from 1997–98 to 2000
New Zealand cricket seasons from 1970–71 to 1999–2000